Doina Levintza (born 10 April 1939, Bucharest) is a Romanian fashion designer. She is the official supplier of the Romanian royal family. She has held presentations of her eponymous label in Monte Carlo, Paris, Washington, New York, London, Prague, Geneva, Madrid, Berlin, Brussels, Chicago.

Awards 
National Order of Merit (Romania) (December 1, 2000) "for outstanding artistic achievements and for the promotion of culture, on Romania's National Day"

References 

1939 births
People from Bucharest
Romanian fashion designers
Romanian women fashion designers
Romanian scenic designers